Sankara College of Science and Commerce is an Autonomous Arts College in Saravanampatti, in the Coimbatore district, Tamil Nadu. It is approved by the All India Council for Technical Education and is affiliated with Bharathiar University. Sankara College of Science and Commerce is accredited by NAAC with 'A' Grade, and also the college is ISO certified.

History
The Sankara Education institutions, sponsored by the Coimbatore Educational and Cultural Foundation Trust, was founded by Sri T.K. Pattabhiraman in August 1982. The other two institutions under Sankara Educational Institutions are Sankara Institute of Management Science (MBA Institute) & Sankara Polytechnic College

Governing council 
The college is currently governed by Shri.T.P.Ramachandran (Secretary&Managing Trustee), Mrs.Sandhya Ramachandran (Joint Secretary), Mr.Kalyanaraman TR (Joint Secretary&Trustee) and Mrs. Nithya Ramachandran(Deputy Joint Secretary)

Location

The college is in Saravanampatty, and is 13 km from Coimbatore International Airport.

Academics

Undergraduate
 B.Com.
 B.Com. CA
 B.Com. PA
 BBA CA
 BCA
 B.Sc. Information Technology
 B.Sc. Electronics and Communication Systems
 B.Sc. Catering Science and Hotel Management
 B.Sc. Computer Science
 B.A. English Literature

Postgraduate
M.Com. - Master of Commerce
M.B.A. - Master of Business Administration
M.Phil.
MCA
Ph.D. Commerce

Campus life 
Sankara College of Science and Commerce has various associations and clubs such as NSS, Red Cross, Parents Association, Commerce Club, and Sports Club. Student also has access to  cafeteria 24/7

Facilities 
 State of art Infrastructure
 Modern Computer Lab
 Digital Library
 Separate hostels for boys and girls
 Library
 Placement cell
 Counselling cell
 Ac Seminar Hall
 E-Learning
 Sports Arena   
 Transport facilities

References

Universities and colleges in Coimbatore
All India Council for Technical Education